The F5WC is the world's largest amateur 5 a side football tournament. Established in 2014, the F5WC has had teams from over 60 countries participate over this period. The inaugural tournament in 2014 was held in Dubai at the Dubai World Trade Centre contested between 32 nations with Denmark winning the very first edition.

In 2015, the World Finals of the F5WC were held once again at Skydive Dubai, with 48 nations competing. Morocco claimed the 2015 title with a win over Spain on penalties.

The 2016 World Finals were held in Bangkok. For third edition of the tournament, F5WC has reverted to 32 country format.

The 2017 World Finals were held in Beijing. Team of United States won the title.

Concept 
The F5WC works with organisers around the world who host local qualifying tournaments in their country. Each Local Organising Committee (LOC) organises a tournament with a minimum of 64 teams participating.

The winning team from each country win an all expenses paid trip to the World Finals destination which includes:
• return airline tickets

• hotel stay

• transportation for the duration of stay

• full home & away playing kit

• exclusive F5WC welcome packages

Qualifiers 

Each local qualifier is independently organised by the "LOC" in accordance with the guidelines preset by the F5WC. These local qualifiers have a fixed period in which to be completed and winning team's data submitted to the F5WC.

The entry fees for qualifiers vary in all the countries taking into consideration various factors. Qualifiers usually run from 30 to 90 days depending on number of teams, participating cities & qualification period set forth by the F5WC.

How to become an LOC 
The F5WC has a set of predefined guidelines to select an LOC in any country. Each LOC is required to submit an application for review. Once the review is complete, the F5WC then selects the organiser. Since, the F5WC is independently organised, it receive multiple applications for each country, the best application is awarded the exclusive rights to the F5WC in their respective country.

Past winners

See also 
 Five-a-side football
 Association football
 Amateur football

References

External links 
 

International association football competitions hosted by the United Arab Emirates